Sylvan James Anderton (born 23 November 1934) is an English former footballer who played in the Football League for Chelsea, Queens Park Rangers and Reading.

References

1934 births
Living people
Sportspeople from Reading, Berkshire
English footballers
Association football wing halves
Reading F.C. players
Chelsea F.C. players
Queens Park Rangers F.C. players
Dover F.C. players
English Football League players
Footballers from Berkshire